A total of 16 CONCACAF teams entered the competition, but FIFA rejected the entry of Belize due to outstanding debt.

There would be two rounds of play:
First Round: Canada, Honduras, El Salvador, United States and Mexico, the five best ranked teams according to FIFA, received byes and advanced to the Second Round directly. The remaining 10 teams were paired up to play knockout matches on a home-and-away basis. The winners would advance to the Second Round.
Second Round: The 10 teams were paired up to play knockout matches on a home-and-away basis. The winners would advance to the tournament.

CONCACAF First Round

Trinidad and Tobago advanced to the Second Round, 5–0 on aggregate score.

Guatemala advanced to the Second Round, 2–1 on aggregate score.

Jamaica advanced to the Second Round, 3–1 on aggregate score.

Netherlands Antilles advanced to the Second Round, 4–1 on aggregate score.

Costa Rica advanced to the Second Round, 3–1 on aggregate score.

CONCACAF Second Round

El Salvador qualified, 6–0 on aggregate score.

United States qualified, 5–1 on aggregate score.

The aggregate score was tied at 1–1, however Trinidad and Tobago qualified on away goals.

1 The tie was scratched and Costa Rica advanced to the Final Round as Mexico were disqualified after being suspended for fielding overaged players during the 1988 CONCACAF U-20 Tournament.

The aggregate score was tied at 3–3, however Guatemala qualified on away goals.''

Goalscorers

3 goals

 Reymundo Rovina

2 goals

 Dale Mitchell
 Ricardo García
 Luis Ramírez Zapata
 Byron Pérez
 Winston Anglin
 Frank Klopas

1 goal

 Ian Bridge
 Juan Cayasso
 Claudio Jara
 Hernán Medford
 Salvador Coreas Privado
 Carlos Castañeda
 Juan Manuel López
 Adán Paniagua
 Juan Alberto Flores
 Dave Brooks
 Alton Sterling
 Shurbi Rosina
 Hutson Charles
 Anton Corneal
 Paul Elliot-Allen
 Marvin Faustin
 Geoffrey Lake
 Dexter Skeene
 Brian Bliss
 Paul Krumpe
 Hugo Pérez
 Víctor René Mendieta Ocampo
 Derrick Edwards

References

CONCACAF Gold Cup qualification
Championship
qualification